Five to Nil (Italian: Cinque a zero) is a 1932 Italian sports comedy film directed by Mario Bonnard and starring Angelo Musco, Milly, and Osvaldo Valenti. It was inspired by a 5–0 victory by A.S. Roma against their rivals Juventus in 1931. It was shot at the studios of Caesar Film and included scenes featuring the real-life Roma players.

Synopsis
The president of a football club becomes concerned that his captain is spending too much time romancing a celebrated nightclub singer and not enough on training.

Cast
 Angelo Musco as Presidente della società calcistica  
 Milly as Billie Grac, a singer  
 Osvaldo Valenti as Barenghi  
 Franco Coop as Direttore d'Orchestra dell'Eden  
 Mario Siletti as Professore di Matematica  
 Luciano Molinari as Direttore del Teatro  
 Maurizio D'Ancora as Masseur 
 Oreste Bilancia as Masseur 
 Tina Lattanzi as Moglie del Presidente  
 Aristide Garbini as Membro del Club  
 Umberto Sacripante as Membro del Club  
 Maria Donati as Spectator
 Giorgio Bianchi as Executive
 Armando Fineschi as Executive
 Mario Colli as Executive
 Augusto Bandini as Augusto
 Camillo Pilotto as Augusto's Deputy
 Niní Gordini Cervi as Billie's sister
 Ugo Fasano as Trainer
 Totò Mignone as Assistant Coach
 Attilio Ferraris as himself
Fulvio Bernardini as himself 
Arturo Chini Ludueña as himself
Bruno Dugoni as himself
Fernando Eusebio as himself
Cesare Augusto Fasanelli as himself
Guido Masetti as himself
Attilio Mattei as himself
Rodolfo Volk as himself

References

Bibliography 
 Moliterno, Gino. Historical Dictionary of Italian Cinema. Scarecrow Press, 2008.

External links 
 

1930s sports comedy films
Italian sports comedy films
1932 films
1930s Italian-language films
Films directed by Mario Bonnard
Italian association football films
Films set in Rome
Italian black-and-white films
1930s Italian films